In Buddhism, an anagārika (Pali, 'homeless one', ; f. anagārikā ) is a person who has given up most or all of their worldly possessions and responsibilities to commit full-time to Buddhist practice. It is a midway status between a bhikkhu or bhikkhuni (fully ordained monastics) and laypersons. An anagārika takes the Eight Precepts, and might remain in this state for life.

Anagārikas usually wear white clothes or robes, depending on the tradition they follow. Some traditions have special ordination ceremonies for anagārikas, while others simply take the eight precepts with a special intention.

Given the lack of full ordination for women in most Theravada-majority countries since the late modern period, women who wish to renounce live as anagārikās under names such as maechi in Thailand, thilashin in Myanmar, and dasa sil mata in Sri Lanka. Women who are nonetheless intent on total renunciation may be fully ordained under certain nikāyas, even in historically Theravada countries. In Vajrayana Buddhism, many nuns are technically anagārikās or śrāmaṇerikās (novitiates).

History
In monastic settings, lay attendants for monks or nuns are needed. The monastic rules restrict monks and nuns from many tasks that might be needed, including the use of money, driving, cooking, digging and cutting plants, so lay attendants help bridge this gap. Anagārikas differ from laity by their commitment to Buddhism, to their precepts, and to monastics. There is usually a notable difference in their manner, appearance and attire. In many cases, they are full-time residents at the vihara where they ordained. Anagārikas often have the intention of becoming a monk or nun at a later point, though not always. In some monasteries a period as an anagārika, often one year, is required in order to take novice ordination. 

The main difference between the Eight Precepts of an anagārika and the Ten Precepts of a novitiate is the rule of not handling money. Therefore, anagārika ordinations usually take place in viharas where the vinaya (monastic rules), including the rules about not handling money, are strictly followed.

Notable Anagārikas
 Anagārika Dharmapāla
 Anagārika Govinda
 Anagārika Munindra
 Anagārika Prajñānanda

External links
 "Monastic: Training," from "BuddhaMind Info".
 "Anagarika Life" from Abhayagiri Monastery Newsletter Spring 2007.
 Anagarika Ordination Questions from DhammaWheel forum, 2014.
 A proper preparation for becoming an anagarika from DhammaWheel forum, 2011.
 Question about Anagarikas from DhammaWheel forum, 2014
 Anagarika is post-canonical invention from DhammaWheel forum, 2017.

 
Buddhist ascetics
Buddhist titles
Buddhist religious occupations
Buddhist monasticism